Eric Axel "Bud" Plahn (July 25, 1919 – June 4, 1998) was an American professional basketball player. He played for the Oshkosh All-Stars in the National Basketball League in 1943–44 and averaged 1.6 points per game.

References

1919 births
1998 deaths
American men's basketball players
Basketball players from Chicago
Guards (basketball)
Forwards (basketball)
Oshkosh All-Stars players
Basketball players from Bakersfield, California